Konstantin Aleksandrov can refer to:

 Konstantin Aleksandrov (sailor) (1920–1987), Soviet Olympic sailor
 Konstantin Aleksandrov (wrestler) (born 1969), Kyrgyzstani Olympic wrestler